Death to Analog is the first album by the  American rock band Julien-K, which had a limited release on March 10, 2009, with a vinyl release on April 7, the digital release and worldwide release on October 20, and the European/Digi-Pak release date on March 5, 2010. Despite a number of delays, the album was confirmed to be released on February 17, 2009, to coincide with the "Death of Analog" television. However, the album's release date was delayed to March 10.

Release
On January 7, 2009, Ryan Shuck confirmed the album's release date on the band's MySpace page and said that the release would be handled by Metropolis Records. The track list was also confirmed on the Metropolis Records website, along with the following press release:

"Julien-K is the brainchild of two of the founding members of the platinum selling group Orgy: Amir Derakh and Ryan Shuck. Fusing the elements of dark electronic club music with styles of modern rock & pop, Julien-K are at the forefront of the electronic music scene. Joined by drummer Elias Andra and studio collaborator and cohort Brandon Belsky on keyboards & vocals, Julien-K push the boundaries of what traditional electronic music is supposed to be with explosive live performances that are larger than life. Executive Produced by Chester Bennington of Linkin Park, their debut album Death to Analog provides a sweeping landscape of musical influences and themes that pull the listener into their world on a first listen; A world where technology is fused with artistic expression in a way that has not been attempted before."

The album was mixed by the producer/engineer Tim Palmer, who has worked with The Cure, Dead or Alive, Gene Loves Jezebel, HIM and U2.

Singles
On January 23, 2009, Julien-K's Myspace page announced that, on February 17, 2009, their first single "Kick the Bass" (with "Dreamland" as a B-side) would be released digitally, coinciding with the planned end of analog television in North America. The explicit video has a sexual theme, including references to bondage and has a cannibalistic twist to it. The video was offered in two versions for different tastes, a clean version as well as an explicit one, with the clean version being released at a later date.

As a teaser, the explicit version of the video was released exclusively on February 10 on Playboy Online which also had a cameo appearance by Linkin Park's lead vocalist, Chester Bennington, his wife Talinda, and Julien-K's Director of Activities Church. The site also offered a three-day trial to coincide with the release, though verification of age (18+) was needed.

"Dreamland" was released as the second single from the album on August 27, 2010.

Track listing

 All tracks are available on purchase of worldwide release of the album.

Death to Digital

Death to Digital X

References

External links
 Ryan's MySpace post regarding the album's release
 Metropolis Record's website for Death to Analog 
 Press Release for JK/DTA (Julien-K MySpace blog)

Julien-K albums
2009 albums
2009 remix albums